Scarabaeus ambiguus is a species of Old World dung beetles. This beetle rolls up a ball of dung before laying eggs on it and burying it.

Description
The forelegs are adapted for squeezing and manipulating loose dung to form balls.

Distribution and habitat
Scarabaeus ambiguus is native to southern Africa, its range including Namibia, Botswana and South Africa. Its range centres on the South African province of KwaZulu-Natal, and adjacent parts of the Eastern Cape where it is found on highveld grassland, bushveld and open woodland, but avoids thick forests and dense stands of trees.

Ecology
Dung beetles locate dung by detecting the odours produced by its volatile constituents. Different species of dung beetle are attracted to the dung produced by different animals. Scarabaeus ambiguus seems to be attracted by both cattle dung and donkey dung. It is diurnal and is particularly active in the morning, in the cool conditions after heavy rain, when it is on the wing earlier than other species of dung beetle.

Status
Scarabaeus ambiguus seems quite common in suitable habitat within its range.

References

Scarabaeinae